The 2002–03 Sussex County Football League season was the 78th in the history of Sussex County Football League a football competition in England.

Division One

Division One featured 18 clubs which competed in the division last season, along with two new clubs, promoted from Division Two:
East Preston
Shoreham

League table

Division Two

Division Two featured 14 clubs which competed in the division last season, along with four new clubs.
Clubs relegated from Division One:
Eastbourne United
Saltdean United
Clubs promoted from Division Three:
Pease Pottage Village
Steyning Town

League table

Division Three

Division Three featured eleven clubs which competed in the division last season, along with four new clubs:
Bosham, relegated from Division Two
Midhurst & Easebourne, joined from the West Sussex League
St Francis Rangers, formed as merger of St Francis and Ansty Rangers
Storrington, relegated from Division Two

Also, Bexhill Town changed name to Bexhill United.

League table

References

2002-03
2002–03 in English football leagues